Conversation Piece, billed as "A Romantic Comedy with Music", is a musical written by Noël Coward. It premiered at His Majesty's Theatre, London, on 16 February 1934, and ran for 177 performances over five months. A Broadway production opened at the 44th Street Theatre later that year but ran for only 55 performances.

Background
Conversation Piece was inspired by the book The Regent and his Daughter by Dormer Creston (1881–1973). Coward wrote the libretto in 1933 while on a sea voyage from Trinidad to England and composed the score on his return home. From the outset, Coward had the French star Yvonne Printemps in mind for the leading role of Mélanie, despite the fact that she spoke no English. Printemps agreed to play the part, and with the aid of her future husband, Pierre Fresnay, learned the words by rote. The male lead, Paul, Duc de Chaucigny-Varennes, was given to Romney Brent, but during rehearsals Coward came to think Brent was not up to the part, and asked him to relinquish it. On learning that Coward himself proposed to take the role, Brent gladly resigned, "providing you let me still come to rehearsals and watch you find out what a bloody awful part it is." Whether or not Coward came to share Brent's view, he handed the part over to Pierre Fresnay after three months. Other members of the large cast included Louis Hayward, Maidie Andrews and George Sanders, with Valerie Hobson in the chorus.

The big tune from the show, "I'll Follow My Secret Heart", caused Coward much difficulty while he was composing the score, and he was on the verge of giving up the whole show:
I poured myself a large whisky and soda... and sat gloomily envisaging everyone's disappointment and facing the fact that my talent had withered and that I should never write any more music until the day I died. ...  I switched off the light at the door and noticed that there was one lamp left on by the piano.  I walked automatically to turn it off, sat down, and played "I'll Follow My Secret Heart" straight through in G flat, a key I had never played in before.

The London production had a truncated run of 177 performances, by contrast with Coward's earlier romantic musical Bitter Sweet, because Printemps had to leave the cast to fulfil a film commitment in France, and no suitable replacement could be found. Later that year, the Broadway run, despite starring Printemps, managed only 55 performances. With the onset of the Depression, times had changed since the success of Bitter Sweet, and Conversation Piece was unable to find an audience. In New York, Fresnay played Paul, Irene Browne was Lady Julia, and Carl Harbord was Edward.

The London cast released a cast album in 1934. Beginning in the late 1940s, Columbia Records recorded a series of musicals produced by Goddard Lieberson and musical director Lehman Engel, including Conversation Piece in 1951. Coward sang the role of Paul, and the recording featured opera singer Lily Pons, the young Richard Burton, Cathleen Nesbitt and Ethel Griffies.

Plot
The story is set in Regency Brighton in 1811. Paul, the Duc de Chaucigny-Varennes, an émigré from the terrors of the French Revolution, is passing off Melanie, a beautiful young girl, as his ward – the daughter of an executed friend, the Marquis de Tramont. In fact, Melanie is a dance hall singer. Paul's plan is to marry Melanie to a rich husband such as Edward, Marquis of Sheere, who seeks her hand. The rich Lady Julia Charteris, who is much taken with Paul, encourages Edward's marital plans and tries to woo Paul for herself. But Melanie has long loved Paul, and in a last gamble to turn him away from Lady Julia, she pretends to return to France. Her trick works: Paul realises the depth of his feelings for her and there is a romantic happy ending.

Musical numbers
Ladies and Gentlemen
Overture
A cloud has passed across the sun
I'll follow my secret heart
Regency rakes
Charming! Charming! Charming!
There's always something fishy about the French
Prologue – Act II
Soldiers!
English lesson – The tree is in the garden
There was once a little village
Melanie's aria – Dear friends
Mothers and wives
Nevermore

The Noël Coward Society's website, drawing on performing statistics from the publishers and the Performing Rights Society, ranks "I'll follow my secret heart" among Coward's ten most popular songs.

Notes

References 
Castle, Charles (1974) Noël, Sphere Books, London, 
Day, Barry (ed.) (2007) The Letters of Noël Coward, Methuen, London, 
Lesley, Cole (1976) The Life of Noël Coward, Jonathan Cape, London, 
Morley, Sheridan (1974) A Talent to Amuse, Penguin, London,

External links
Conversation Piece at the IBDB database
Information about Conversation piece at the Guide to Musical Theatre
Theatre programme and information about the show

1934 musicals
West End musicals
Original musicals
Musicals by Noël Coward